A list of films produced in Italy in 1947 (see 1947 in film):

References

External links
Italian films of 1947 at the Internet Movie Database

Italian
1947
Films